Spriegel is a surname. Notable people with the surname include:

Matthew Spriegel (born 1987), English cricketer
William Spriegel (1893–1972), American automotive business executive, business theorist, and academic administrator

See also
Spiegel (surname)